The Lincoln Liberty Life Insurance Building is a historic building in Lincoln, Nebraska. It was built in 1906–07 as a five-story building designed in the Commercial style by Ferdinard C. Fiske and Charles A. Dieman, and originally known as the Little Building. It was redesigned in the Art Deco style by architects Harry Meginnis and Edward G. Schaumberg in 1936, and renamed the Lincoln Liberty Life Insurance Building to reflect its new owner. It has been listed on the National Register of Historic Places since January 19, 1988.

References

		
National Register of Historic Places in Lincoln, Nebraska
Chicago school (architecture)
Art Deco architecture in Nebraska
Commercial buildings completed in 1936